Fort White is a town in Columbia County, Florida, United States, named after a military fort built in the 1830s. It is the closest town to Ichetucknee Springs State Park. Fort White High School and the Fort White Public School Historic District are located within the town's borders. The original school building was constructed in 1915.

As of the 2020 census, the population of Fort White was 618.

History

Fort White was originally constructed as a military fort during the Second Seminole War in 1836 to protect the Cow Creek settlement. Supplies were brought in by steamboat on the Santa Fe River and distributed to other area forts.

The town was incorporated in 1884 still named after the military fort Fort White and grew steadily following the arrival of the railroad in 1888. Phosphate mining, turpentine and agriculture (cotton and oranges) were the foundation of the economy, and the population grew to nearly 2,000. The boom turned to bust as severe freezes in the winters of 1896 and 1897 destroyed the local citrus industry. By 1910, the largest phosphate deposits were depleted and mining ceased. The boll weevil ended cotton farming before World War I, and the population shrank to a few hundred people, primarily farmers, ranchers and foresters. The town's population in 1979 was 365.

Geography

Fort White is located in southern Columbia County at  (29.923001, –82.714299), at the intersection of U.S. Route 27 and Florida State Road 47. SR 47 leads north  to Lake City, the Columbia County seat, and south  to Trenton. US 27 leads southeast  to Alachua and Interstate 75, and west  to Branford.

Most of the land surrounding the town is family farms and/or forests.

Demographics

As of the census of 2010, there were 567 people, 151 households, and 104 families residing in the town. The racial makeup of the town was 50.61% White, 46.70% African American, 0.24% Native American, 0.49% Asian, 0.24% Pacific Islander, and 1.71% from two or more races. Hispanic or Latino of any race were 3.42% of the population.

There were 151 households, out of which 33.8% had children under the age of 18 living with them, 43.7% were married couples living together, 19.2% had a female householder with no husband present, and 31.1% were non-families. 28.5% of all households were made up of individuals, and 9.9% had someone living alone who was 65 years of age or older.  The average household size was 2.71 and the average family size was 3.35.

In the town, the population was spread out, with 28.6% under the age of 18, 8.1% from 18 to 24, 24.9% from 25 to 44, 22.5% from 45 to 64, and 15.9% who were 65 years of age or older.  The median age was 37 years. For every 100 females, there were 76.3 males.  For every 100 females age 18 and over, there were 82.5 males.

The median income for a household in the town was $26,250, and the median income for a family was $28,000. Males had a median income of $26,477 versus $26,667 for females. The per capita income for the town was $10,578.  About 24.1% of families and 26.8% of the population were below the poverty line, including 23.0% of those under age 18 and 42.0% of those age 65 or over.

Schools

The original Fort White High School was constructed during 1915, and an auditorium was added in 1936. Separate elementary school classrooms were completed in 1938.

The last high school class to graduate was in 1969, about the same time desegregation and integration forced the closing of the black schools in the area. At that time, there weren't enough children to justify a high school in Fort White; students in grades 9–12 were bused  to Columbia High School in Lake City for over 30 years. After Ichetucknee Springs State Park opened in 1971, the population in the south end of the county steadily grew to the point where the need for a local facility was substantiated. A $25 million high school was completed in December 2000 for grades 6–12, having opened in August 2000 in temporary buildings because of construction delays. The school had been scheduled for completion in August 2000.  Fort White High School graduated the first class in a generation in 2001. A new Fort White Middle School for grade 6 was completed prior to the 2008–2009 school year. The rest of the middle school (for grades 7 and 8) has recently been finished and is in use, though the middle and high school are still joined.

Government services
The town elects a mayor and four town council members who meet once each month. Water is provided through the city, but all residents utilize a septic tank system for sewerage. Law enforcement is provided by the Columbia County Sheriff's Office who utilize a sub-station within the city limits. Fire protection is provided by the Columbia County Fire Department. Garbage collection is subcontracted to a private company. The Fort White Branch of the Columbia County Public Library system, which was previously located next to town hall, is across from Fort White High School. The county health clinic has a satellite office in Fort White which is open one day each week, but the nearest hospital facility is in Lake City.

The Fort White Sports Complex was constructed in 2005 on  abutting the high school. Facilities include six baseball fields, two basketball courts and two tennis courts. A community center was built on the site in 2008. A senior citizen meal program operates at the center on weekdays.

The Ichetucknee River
However, before 1970, the existence and location of this natural wonder were not widely known. The road to the spring was not paved, nor was it marked, because the spring was on private property. In 1970, the state of Florida purchased the Ichetucknee spring and river property from the Loncala Phosphate Corporation. Columbia County built a paved road, number 238, providing easier access to the springs. In 1972, the head spring of the river was declared a National Natural Landmark by the U.S. Department of the Interior. The main tributary from Ichetucknee Springs became one of the most popular tubing destinations in the world, attracting up to 5,000 visitors each day during the summer. Others came to the river to swim, picnic, snorkel, scuba dive, and explore the nearby forests.

References

Towns in Columbia County, Florida
White
White
Pre-statehood history of Florida
Towns in Florida
1836 establishments in Florida Territory
Populated places established in 1836